The Elevation of the Holy Cross (also known as the Exaltation of the Holy Cross) is one of the Great Feasts of the Orthodox Church, celebrated on September 14. It is one of the two feast days which is held as a strict fast. The other is the commemoration of the Beheading of John the Forerunner on August 29.

See also 
 Feast of the Cross

External links
 https://web.archive.org/web/20070404001644/http://www.antiochian.org/1420
 http://www.goarch.org/archbishop/demetrios/messages/2005/holycross2005
 https://web.archive.org/web/20070903084533/http://www.balamand.edu.lb/theology/feastcross.htm

Eastern Orthodox liturgical days
Constantine the Great and Christianity
September observances 
ka:ჯვართამაღლება